Thomas Joseph O'Connell (21 November 1882 – 22 June 1969) was an Irish Labour Party politician who served as Leader of the Labour Party from 1927 to 1932. He served as a Teachta Dála (TD) from 1922 to 1932. He was a Senator for the Cultural and Educational Panel from 1938 to 1944, 1948 to 1951 and 1954 to 1957.

Background
Thomas Joseph O'Connell was born near Knock, County Mayo, the second child of Maria Biesty and Thomas Connell. As part of the Gaelic revival, his family adopted the prefix "O" to their surname in the early 20th Century. His father was a farmer who was politically active and a community leader. Family lore held that his father had been a Fenian who had taken part in the Fenian Rising of 1867. He was also an activist in the Land League and a member of the United Irish League (UIL). One of Thomas's aunts, Mary O'Connell, had been one of the first witnesses of the Marian Apparition at Knock in 1879. Perhaps unsurprisingly, this may have influenced the fact that Thomas was a devout Catholic throughout his life.

He qualified as a teacher in St Patrick's training college, Drumcondra, Dublin. He taught at Horseleap, County Westmeath (1902–1905), then served as principal teacher at Streamstown, County Westmeath (1905–1916). In 1916 he became general secretary of the Irish National Teachers' Organisation (INTO), which post he would occupy until retirement in 1948.

In 1906 married Kathleen O'Connor, a fellow national school teacher. They had four children in the first five years of their marriage. A fifth child died shortly after birth. When Kathleen arranged for a substitute teacher to cover for her while she recovered from the loss of their child, she received a financial penalty from her employers for doing so. O'Connell was furious, and as a leading member of the INTO set upon a vigorous campaign to have the rule that prompted the fine removed. The campaign threw O'Connell into the national spotlight. O'Connell was able to use the old UIL connections of his father to contact John Dillon and other Irish MPs to raise the issue in the House of Commons, and eventually, the rule was dropped. The campaign was hailed as a great victory for the INTO and women teachers in Ireland.

Political career
At the 1922 general election, he was elected as Teachta Dála (TD) for Galway, and he was re-elected at the 1923 general election. O'Connell was able to utilise a strong grassroots organisation in the constituency as well as the vote of teachers to secure victory.

At the June 1927 election he stood instead in the new five-seat Mayo South constituency, where he topped the poll, and he was re-elected at the September 1927 election. In Mayo, O'Connell relied on the support of Teachers, migrant workers on Achill Island who were reckoned to better understand what a labour party stood for than other parts of Ireland, and the support of the area around his family's homeland of South Mayo: Bekan, Knock and Ballyhaunis.

A critical blunder for O'Connell and the Labour Party occurred during the 5th Dáil. In August 1927, Fianna Fáil decided to enter the Dáil and it gave its support to the Labour Party's motion of no confidence in the Cumann na nGaedheal government. The plan was to replace it with a Labour-led coalition with Labour leader Thomas Johnson as President of the Executive Council. O'Connell was envisioned to be the new Minister for Education. The Labour Party was supported by Fianna Fáil and the National League Party. On the other hand, the Cumann na nGaedheal government had the backing of the Farmers' Party and most of the Independent TDs. When the vote was taken, John Jinks, a National League TD, failed to attend. O'Connell himself was also missing, as he was away in Canada attending a conference on behalf of the INTO. The vote of no-confidence was a tie, and thus the Ceann Comhairle was allowed to cast the deciding vote, siding with the government. A rare chance in Irish history to place a labour led coalition in government has been missed.

Labour Party leader
The 5th Dáil collapsed after just four months in office, resulting in the September 1927 Irish general election. The election did not go well for Labour, and they lost all the seats they had gained in the June 1927 Irish general election plus an additional one. One of the casualties was Labour Leader Thomas Johnson. The Labour Party's rule stated the leader must be a sitting TD. As such, O'Connell was unanimously elected the new leader of the party, a position he would hold until 1932.

O'Connell inherited from Johnson a not particularly disciplined Labour Party. Johnson himself commented privately that between 13 TDs and 5 senators, no two of them could ever agree on the fundamental values of the party. Labour TDs not voting in line with the rest of the party was more common than with the other parties. In October 1931, the Cumann na Gaedhael government rushed to pass the Public Safety Act 1931. The act would allow the government to establish a military tribunal for hearing political cases as well as the right to suspend constitutional guarantees on their own discretion. It came in response to rising Irish Republican Army activity across the country but Labour and its members feared greatly it would trample civil liberties. An internal labour vote was held on the bill and by a margin of 3 to 1 they voted to oppose the bill. O'Connell denounced the bill in the Dáil, declaring it made a farce of the institution and that Cumann na Gaedhael might as well establish a military dictatorship in Ireland while they were at it. However, when the votes were cast on the bill, two Labour TDs, Deputy Labour leader Daniel Morrissey and Richard Anthony, broke ranks and voted with the government. Given the magnitude of such a fundamental vote, O'Connell felt he was forced to expel the two TDs from the party for their actions.

Another issue O'Connell dealt with during his tenure was in 1930 with the Letitia Dunbar-Harrison affair, perhaps better known as the "Mayo Librarian Affair". Dunbar-Harrison had applied to become county librarian in Mayo, a position was that was vacant at the time. Ultimately the County Council refused to offer the position, on the stated reason she could not speak Irish but, as many felt, with the subtext being she was denied on account of being a Protestant. The issue ballooned and escalated into a national political issue with Cumann na Gaedhael supporting her appointment but the Catholic Bishops and many of the opposition parties opposing it. Perhaps surprisingly, the normally avowed non-sectarian Labour was amongst those opposing the appointment, with O'Connell working with the likes of the Archbishop of Tuam to advocate against it.

From 1929 to 1930 he was president of the Irish Labour Party and the Irish Trades Union Congress. In 1935 he co-founded the Educational Building Society with Alexander McCabe.

Later political life
He lost his seat at the 1932 election, did not contest the 1933 general election, and in 1941 he was elected to 3rd Seanad. In 1943, he was elected to the 4th Seanad by the Cultural and Educational Panel, but did not contest the 1944 Seanad election. The Cultural and Educational Panel re-elected him in 1948 to the 6th Seanad and in 1954 to the 8th Seanad.

References

Sources
Thomas Johnson, 1872–1963, John Anthony Gaughan, Kingdom Books, Dublin, 1980, 

1882 births
1969 deaths
Irish trade unionists
Leaders of the Labour Party (Ireland)
Labour Party (Ireland) TDs
Labour Party (Ireland) senators
Members of the 3rd Dáil
Members of the 4th Dáil
Members of the 5th Dáil
Members of the 6th Dáil
Members of the 3rd Seanad
Members of the 4th Seanad
Members of the 6th Seanad
Members of the 8th Seanad
People of the Irish Civil War (Pro-Treaty side)
Politicians from County Mayo
Politicians from County Galway
Alumni of St Patrick's College, Dublin